Hakoah means "The Strength" and may refer to any one of these Jewish sport organizations:

 Hakoah Vienna, an athletic club in Austria that is the origin of the Hakoah name
 Hakoah Bergen County, an amateur football club in New Jersey
 Brooklyn Hakoah, a defunct football club in the United States of America
 Hakoah Berlin, a defunct football club in Berlin, Germany
 Club Náutico Hacoaj, a sport club in Argentina
 FC Hakoah, a football club in Switzerland
 Hakoah All-Stars, a defunct football club in the United States of America
 Hakoah Amidar Ramat Gan F.C., a football club in Israel
 Melbourne Hakoah, a defunct football club in Australia
 New York Hakoah, a defunct football club in the United States of America
 Hakoah Sydney City East FC a football club in Australia
 Hakoah Riga, a defunct football club in Latvia
 Hakoah Prague, a Jewish sport club in Prague
Hakoah Centers,  a defunct football club in Chicago